"Turn It On, Turn It Up, Turn Me Loose" is a song written by Kostas and Wayland Patton, and recorded by American country music artist Dwight Yoakam.  It was released in September 1990 as the lead-off single from his album If There Was a Way. It peaked at #11 in the United States, and #5 in Canada.

Content
The narrator has lost a former lover, and her memory won't leave his mind, so he requests that the music be turned on with the volume up as it will help him forget her.

Music video
The music video was directed by Steve Vaughan.

Chart performance

Year-end charts

References

1990 singles
Dwight Yoakam songs
Songs written by Kostas (songwriter)
Reprise Records singles
Song recordings produced by Pete Anderson
1990 songs
Songs written by Wayland Patton